The England national rugby league team represent England in international rugby league matches. The team is governed by the Rugby Football League, and is a full member of the RLIF and RLEF.

Since the team's first official match in 1904, over 700 players have been selected to represent England. The following is a list of all players who have been awarded a heritage number by the Rugby Football League.

Players

See also
List of Great Britain national rugby league team players

References

External links
 
 
 

 England
 
England